Tomáš Urban (born 12 May 1968) is a retired Czech football defender.

References

1968 births
Living people
Czech footballers
SK Slavia Prague players
Dukla Prague footballers
Bohemians 1905 players
AC Sparta Prague players
FK Jablonec players
FC Hradec Králové players
FK Viktoria Žižkov players
FC DAC 1904 Dunajská Streda players
Czech First League players
Association football defenders
Czech expatriate footballers
Expatriate footballers in Slovakia
Czech expatriate sportspeople in Slovakia